Means By Which The End Is Justified is an EP by the metalcore/mathcore band Into the Moat. It was released in 2003 by Lovelost Records.

Track listing
"Battle-Spawned Lullabies" - 2:58
"The Golden Vile" - 2:57
"Demise" - 3:37
"Anguish" - 2:55
"A Settling Of Ways" - 3:38
"Century I" - 3:12

2003 EPs
Into the Moat albums